Aerotrans Airlines was an airline from Cyprus. It was operational from 1999 to 2002.

References

Defunct airlines of Cyprus
Airlines established in 1999
Airlines disestablished in 2002
1999 establishments in Cyprus
Paphos